George Cloughessy is an Australian actor and professional wrestler he wrestled for All Japan Pro Wrestling and World Championship Wrestling and various other promotions in Australia, Hong Kong, Japan, South Africa, Mexico and North America.

Professional wrestling career
He toured the United States with success several times in the 1970s and 1980s and teamed with fellow Aussies Bill Dundee and Johnny Gray, and when he returned to Australia he changed his gimmick to anti-Aussie and pro-American and claimed that he had become a Yank and hated everything Australian.

Personal life
He was a lifelong fan of the Balmain Tigers, which became one of his wrestling gimmicks.

Championships and accomplishments
 American Wrestling Association/Continental Wrestling Association
 CWA/AWA International Heavyweight Championship (1 time)
 AWA Southern Tag Team Championship (2 times) - with Bill Dundee
 World Championship Wrestling (Australia)
 NWA Austra-Asian Tag Team Championship (1 time) - with Bobby Shane
 World Brass Knuckles Championship (1 time)
 Australian Heavyweight Championship (1 time)
 Australian Light Heavyweight Championship (1 time)

References

External links

Living people
Sportspeople from Sydney
Sportsmen from New South Wales
Australian male professional wrestlers
Year of birth missing (living people)
20th-century professional wrestlers
AWA International Heavyweight Champions
NWA Austra-Asian Tag Team Champions
World Brass Knuckles Champions